Gustaf Nielsen (21 April 1910 – 25 June 1973) was a Danish sports shooter. He competed in two events at the 1948 Summer Olympics.

References

External links
 

1910 births
1973 deaths
Danish male sport shooters
Olympic shooters of Denmark
Shooters at the 1948 Summer Olympics
People from Frederikshavn
Sportspeople from the North Jutland Region